Play in Group F of the 1990 FIFA World Cup completed on 21 June 1990. England won the group and advanced to the second round, along with the Republic of Ireland and the Netherlands. Egypt failed to advance. This group has the record (along with the 1982 Group 1) of the most draws (five) of any "group round" in World Cup history.

Standings

Matches
All times local (CEST/UTC+2)

England vs Republic of Ireland

Netherlands vs Egypt

England vs Netherlands

Republic of Ireland vs Egypt

England vs Egypt

Republic of Ireland vs Netherlands

Group F
Group
Group
Group
Group